Nogometni klub Zavrč or simply NK Zavrč was a Slovenian football club from Zavrč. The club was founded in 1969, but ceased operations in 2016 due to financial difficulties. The same year, the club was refounded as DNŠ Zavrč and started at the bottom of the football pyramid.

History
The club was founded in 1969 under the name ŠD Bratstvo Zavrč. During the 2016–17 season, Zavrč was dissolved due to financial difficulties. In 2016, a new club was founded under the name DNŠ Zavrč. Legally, the two clubs' records and honours are kept separate by the Football Association of Slovenia.

Between 2008–09 and 2012–13, Zavrč earned five consecutive promotions from the sixth division to the Slovenian PrvaLiga, the top level of Slovenian football.

Stadium
Zavrč Sports Park, also known as Zavrč Stadium, is located in Zavrč. The stadium received floodlights in May 2012. However, the floodlights were removed in 2017 and sold to Aluminij due to financial problems of the club. In 2013 the stadium was completely renovated with the old stand demolished and a new main stand constructed, which opened in 2015. The stand has a seating capacity of 962.

Honours
Slovenian Second League
 Winners: 2012–13

Slovenian Third League
 Winners: 2004–05, 2006–07, 2011–12

Slovenian Fourth Division
 Winners: 2003–04, 2010–11

Slovenian Fifth Division
 Winners: 2001–02, 2009–10

Slovenian Sixth Division
 Winners: 2008–09

MNZ Ptuj Cup
 Winners: 2003–04, 2005–06, 2007–08, 2010–11, 2011–12, 2012–13

League history since 1991

References

External links
PrvaLiga profile 
Soccerway profile

Defunct football clubs in Slovenia
Association football clubs established in 1969
Association football clubs disestablished in 2016
1969 establishments in Yugoslavia
2016 disestablishments in Slovenia